Booze bus may refer to:
A sobriety checkpoint in Australia and New Zealand
A mobile drunk tank in the UK